Lecanora subimmergens is a species of lichen in the family Lecanoraceae. It was described as new to science by the Finnish naturalist Edvard August Vainio in 1921.

See also
List of Lecanora species

References

Lichen species
Lichens described in 1921
Lichens of North America
subimmergens
Taxa named by Edvard August Vainio